Pieter Hendrik "Peter" Kooijmans (6 July 1933 – 13 February 2013) was a Dutch politician, jurist, and  diplomat. He was of the defunct Anti-Revolutionary Party (ARP), which later merged into the Christian Democratic Appeal (CDA) party. From 1993 to 1994, he served as Foreign Minister of the Netherlands, succeeding Hans van den Broek. In 1995, he returned to his former position as Professor of Public International Law at the University of Leiden, serving until his appointment to the International Court of Justice. He was granted the honorary title of Minister of State on 13 July 2007.

Early life and education
Pieter Hendrik Kooijmans was born on 6 July 1933 in Heemstede in the Netherlands. His father was Johannes Kooijmans, an engineer and a member of the municipal council of Heemstede, and his mother was Alida Jonker.

Kooijmans went to the secondary school Eerste Christelijk Lyceum in Haarlem, where he followed the gymnasium program in humanities.

Kooijmans studied at the Free University Amsterdam from July 1951, majoring in Economics and Law, obtaining a Bachelor of Economics degree in June 1953 and an Bachelor of Laws degree in July 1954. He then worked as a student researcher before graduating with a Master of Economics degree in June 1957 and an Master of Laws degree in July 1958. Kooijmans worked as a researcher at the Free University Amsterdam from July 1958 until January 1960, and then as an associate professor of International law there from 1 January 1960 until 20 February 1964, when he earned a doctorate as an Doctor of Law in Constitutional law.

In 1951, he started his studies economics and Dutch law at the Free University in Amsterdam. He received his candidate degree in economics (Bachelor of Economics) in 1955 and his master's degree in law (Master of Law) cum laude in 1957. He obtained his doctorate in constitutional law (Doctor of Law) with his dissertation The doctrine of the legal equality of states; an inquiry into the foundations of international law at the Free University in 1964.

Academic and political career
Following graduation, Kooijmans joined the University's faculty as Professor of Public International Law and European Law, from 20 February 1964 until 11 May 1973. In 1976 and again in 1991, he served as a lecturer at The Hague Academy of International Law. From 1978 to 1992, he served as a Professor of Public International Law at the University of Leiden.

He served in the Dutch Foreign Ministry as State Secretary for Foreign Affairs from 1973 to 1977. After the election of 1972 Kooijmans was appointed as State Secretary for Foreign Affairs in the Cabinet Den Uyl until 19 December 1977. The Cabinet Den Uyl fell on 22 March 1977 after four years of tensions in the coalition and continued to serve in a demissionary capacity. In May 1977 Kooijmans announced that he wouldn't stand for the election of 1977. Following the cabinet formation of 1977 Kooijmans was not giving a cabinet post in the new cabinet, the Cabinet Den Uyl was replaced by the Cabinet Van Agt–Wiegel on 19 December 1977.

Kooijmans semi-retired from national politics and became active in the public sector and served as a professor of International law and International relations at the Leiden University from 10 January 1978 until 20 December 1992 and served as a professor of International law and International relations at The Hague Academy of International Law from 1 August 1979 until 1 November 1989. Kooijmans also served as an diplomat on behalf of the United Nations as a special rapporteur on Human rights and Torture.

Kooijmans was appointed as Minister of Foreign Affairs in the Cabinet Lubbers III following the appointment of Hans van den Broek as the European Commissioner, taking office on 3 January 1993. In September 1993 Kooijmans announced that he would not stand for the election of 1994. The Cabinet Cabinet Lubbers III was replaced by the Cabinet Kok I on 22 August 1994.

He served as a Judge on the International Court of Justice from 1997 to 2006.

On 5 February 2014, Kooijmans' alma mater, the Vrije Universiteit started the Kooijmans Institute.

Decorations

References

External links

Official
  Mr.Dr. P.H. (Peter) Kooijmans Parlement & Politiek

 

 
 

 

1933 births
2013 deaths
Anti-Revolutionary Party politicians
Christian Democratic Appeal politicians
Commanders of the Order of Orange-Nassau
Dutch academic administrators
Dutch expatriates in the United States
Dutch humanitarians
Dutch human rights activists
Dutch legal writers
20th-century Dutch judges
Dutch judges of United Nations courts and tribunals
Dutch officials of the United Nations
Dutch political writers
Dutch scholars of constitutional law
Grand Crosses 1st class of the Order of Merit of the Federal Republic of Germany
The Hague Academy of International Law people
International law scholars
International Court of Justice judges
Knights of the Order of the Netherlands Lion
Academic staff of Leiden University
Ministers of Foreign Affairs of the Netherlands
Ministers of State (Netherlands)
State Secretaries for Foreign Affairs of the Netherlands
People from Heemstede
People from Wassenaar
Protestant Church Christians from the Netherlands
Reformed Churches Christians from the Netherlands
United Nations Special Rapporteurs on torture
Academic staff of Vrije Universiteit Amsterdam
20th-century Dutch diplomats
20th-century Dutch educators
20th-century Dutch male writers
20th-century Dutch politicians
21st-century Dutch diplomats
21st-century Dutch educators
21st-century Dutch judges
21st-century Dutch male writers